Samuel Jackson Kimber (October 29, 1854 – November 7, 1925) was an American Major League Baseball player who pitched one full season, for the 1884 Brooklyn Atlantics of the American Association, and one game for the 1885 Providence Grays of the National League.

Although his career was short, Sam did have one shining moment, on October 4, 1884, he pitched baseball's first extra-inning no-hitter. He pitched this game against the Toledo Blue Stockings, a game that lasted ten innings and ended in a scoreless tie, when it was called because of darkness.

Kimber died in his hometown of Philadelphia, he was interred at Westminster Cemetery in Bala Cynwyd, Pennsylvania.

See also

 List of Major League Baseball no-hitters

References

External links

1854 births
1925 deaths
Major League Baseball pitchers
Baseball players from Philadelphia
19th-century baseball players
Providence Grays players
Brooklyn Atlantics (AA) players
Brooklyn Grays (Interstate Association) players
Camden Merritts players
Newark Domestics players
Richmond Virginians (minor league) players
Williamsport (minor league baseball) players
Atlanta Atlantas players
Jersey City Jerseys players
Danbury Hatters players
Wheeling (minor league baseball) players
Wheeling National Citys players
Wheeling Nailers (baseball) players
Portland (minor league baseball) players
Philadelphia Giants (Middle States League) players
Reading (minor league baseball) players
Shenandoah Hungarian Rioters players